François Jouffroy (1 February 1806 – 25 June 1882) was a French sculptor.

Biography
Jouffroy was born in Dijon, France, the son of a baker, and attended the local drawing school before being admitted to the École des Beaux-Arts in Paris in 1824. In 1832 he won the Prix de Rome. Jouffroy often had to compete with Pierre-Jean David d'Angers for public commissions, but during the Second Empire (1851–1870) he still participated in the decoration of several public buildings.

He was a professor at the École des Beaux-Arts from 1865 until his death. Among his students were Per Hasselberg, Jean Dampt, Léopold Morice, Augustus Saint-Gaudens, José Simões de Almeida (Tio), António Soares dos Reis, Elisa de Lamartine, and Adrien Étienne Gaudez. Jouffroy died at Laval, Mayenne in 1882.

Works

Gallery of images

References

Artists from Dijon
French architectural sculptors
Prix de Rome for sculpture
1806 births
1882 deaths
Members of the Académie des beaux-arts
19th-century French sculptors
French male sculptors
19th-century French male artists